Marguerite de Morlaye (29 January 1870, Saint-Mandé –18 September 1957, Paris) was a French actress.

Selected filmography
 Martyr (1927)
 A Foolish Maiden (1929)
 The Wonderful Day (1932)
 La dame de chez Maxim's (1933)
 Les yeux noirs (1935)
 The Devil in the Bottle (1935)
 The King (1936)
 Compliments of Mister Flow (1936)
 Nights of Fire (1937)
 The Green Jacket (1937)
 The Kings of Sport (1937)
 The Club of Aristocrats (1937)
 Kreutzer Sonata (1937)
 Gibraltar (1938)
 The Patriot (1938)
 Café de Paris (1938)
 I Was an Adventuress (1938)
 Law of the north (1939)
 Beating Heart (1940)
 Bolero (1942)
 L'amant de Bornéo (1942)
 Fantastic Night (1942)
 Strange Inheritance (1943)
 The Phantom Baron (1943)
 The Murderer is Not Guilty (1946)
 Six Hours to Lose (1946)
 Goodbye Darling (1946)
 The Royalists (1947)

Bibliography
 Rentschler, Eric. The Films of G.W. Pabst: An Extraterritorial Cinema. Rutgers University Press, 1990.

External links

1870 births
1957 deaths
People from Saint-Mandé
French stage actresses
French film actresses
French silent film actresses
20th-century French actresses